The 2017 NBA Africa Game was an exhibition basketball game played on August 5, 2017, in the Ticketpro Dome in Johannesburg, South Africa. It was the second NBA game to take place on the continent of Africa and the first since the NBA Africa Game 2015. The teams involved were Team Africa, featuring NBA players and alumni that were born in or had parents born in Africa, and Team World, featuring NBA players from the rest of the world.

Rosters 

CAP Deng and Sefolosha were the captains for Team Africa.
CAP Nowitzki and Walker were the captains for Team World.
INJ Embiid did not play because of injury.

Notes

References 

2017–18 NBA season
2017 in African basketball
2017 in South African sport
International basketball competitions hosted by South Africa
National Basketball Association games
NBA Africa Game